Marquise Javon Williams (born October 5, 1992) is a former American football quarterback. He played college football at North Carolina. Williams was signed by the Green Bay Packers as an undrafted free agent in 2016, later playing for the Saskatchewan Roughriders of the Canadian Football League (CFL), the San Antonio Commanders of the Alliance of American Football (AAF), and the New York Guardians of the XFL.

Early years
Williams attended Mallard Creek High School in Charlotte, North Carolina. As a senior, he threw for 3,034 yards with 45 touchdowns and rushed for 1,147 yards and 19 touchdowns. Williams was a four-star recruit by Rivals.com and was ranked as the ninth best dual-threat quarterback in his class.

College career
After redshirting in 2011, Williams appeared in nine games as Bryn Renner's backup as a redshirt freshman in 2012. He passed for 127 yards and a touchdown and also rushed for 186 yards with three touchdowns. Williams entered his sophomore season in 2013 as Renner's backup. After Renner suffered an injury that caused him to miss the rest of the season, Williams became the starter. Against Old Dominion, he set the school record for total yards in a game with 469. In total he appeared in 12 games with six starts, completing 126 of 217 passes for 1,698 yards, 15 touchdowns and six interceptions. He also led the team in rushing yards with 536, becoming the first quarterback to lead North Carolina in rushing since Gayle Bomar in 1968. Williams entered his junior season in 2014 as the starter. He passed for 3,068 yards with 21 passing touchdowns and added 13 rushing touchdowns.

Williams returned as a starter and team captain his senior year in 2015, leading the Tar Heels to the ACC Coastal Division title and the ACC Championship Game. Over the course of the season, Williams passed for 3,072 yards and 24 passing touchdowns while recording 13 rushing touchdowns.  Against Duke University, Williams had a historic performance.  He threw for 494 passing yards, which was a school record for passing yards in a game, and four touchdowns, and rushed for another touchdown. Williams' single-game passing yards record was eclipsed in 2020 by Sam Howell who threw for 550 yards in a win against Wake Forest.

Statistics

Professional career

Williams attended rookie minicamp with the Minnesota Vikings on a tryout basis in May 2016.

Green Bay Packers
Williams was signed by the Green Bay Packers on May 26, 2016. On September 3, 2016, he was released by the Packers during final team cuts.

Saskatchewan Roughriders
In May 2017, Williams signed as a rookie free agent with the Saskatchewan Roughriders of the Canadian Football League (CFL). Throughout the two-game preseason, Williams completed 10 passes out of 12 attempts, for 115 yards, and one interception. Williams made the Roughriders roster as the third quarterback on June 17, beating out Vince Young who, like Williams, had also played for the Green Bay Packers during a preseason. Williams also beat out Bryan Bennett for the job.

In May 2018, Williams took reps against the Edmonton Eskimos in the opening preseason game of the 2018 CFL season, completing 3 of his 7 pass attempts for 32 yards and an interception. On May 28, 2018, Williams and three other players were released by the Roughriders the day after their 35–12 preseason loss to the Eskimos.

San Antonio Commanders
In the inaugural AAF QB Draft, the San Antonio Commanders used their second-round pick on Williams, who had initially been allocated to the Atlanta Legends. He was primarily used as a change-of-pace backup, earning a handful of plays but filling in well whenever starter Logan Woodside was benched or injured. Williams completed over 70% of his passing attempts, including a touchdown and a two-point conversion, and rushed for nearly six yards per carry. The league ceased operations in April 2019.

New York Guardians
In October 2019, Williams was drafted by the New York Guardians in the tenth round of the 2020 XFL Draft. Williams was active for all 5 games in the COVID-19 shortened season, seeing snaps in 3 of them; he spent most of the season as the team's third-string quarterback behind Matt McGloin and Luis Perez. Williams' completed 23 out of 48 passes in relief work, as well as being used as a situational rusher with 5 carries for 29 yards and a touchdown. Another of Williams' runs gained 16 yards on a fake punt, converting the first down in opponent territory. He had his contract terminated when the league suspended operations on April 10, 2020.

Career statistics

Personal life
In February 2021, Marquise started his career as a professional Twitch streamer. Marquise streams himself on the football based game, Madden NFL 21, in front of his viewers. His Twitch name is mjwilliams.

References

External links
 Green Bay Packers bio
 North Carolina Tar Heels bio
 

1992 births
Living people
Players of American football from North Carolina
People from Shelby, North Carolina
American football quarterbacks
Canadian football quarterbacks
American players of Canadian football
North Carolina Tar Heels football players
Green Bay Packers players
Saskatchewan Roughriders players
Atlanta Legends players
San Antonio Commanders players
New York Guardians players